Villanueva del Río Segura is a municipality in the Region of Murcia, Spain.

References

Municipalities in the Region of Murcia